Pleonotoma is a genus of tropical, flowering lianas located in the family Bignoniaceae.

Species
Pleonotoma albiflora (Salzm. ex DC.) A.H.Gentry	  
Pleonotoma bracteate A.H.Gentry	
Pleonotoma castelnaei (Bureau) Sandwith	
Pleonotoma clematis (Kunth) Miers
Pleonotoma dendrotricha Sandwith
Pleonotoma dispar Kraenzl.
Pleonotoma echitidea Sprague & Sandwith	 
Pleonotoma exserta A.H.Gentry
Pleonotoma fissicalyx B.M.Gomes & Proença
Pleonotoma fluminensis (Vell.) A.H.Gentry
Pleonotoma fomosum Bureau 
Pleonotoma jasminifolia (Kunth) Miers
Pleonotoma longiflora B.M.Gomes & Proença 
Pleonotoma macrotis Kraenzl.
Pleonotoma melioides (S.Moore) A.H.Gentry
Pleonotoma orientalis Sandwith
Pleonotoma pavettiflora Sandwith
Pleonotoma stichadenia K.Schum. 
Pleonotoma stichadenium K. Schum. 
Pleonotoma tetraquetra (Cham.) Bureau
Pleonotoma tetraquetrum Bureau
Pleonotoma variabilis (Jacq.) Miers

See also

References

Bignoniaceae
Bignoniaceae genera
Vines